Carl "Calle" Björk (born 4 February 1992) is a Swedish footballer who plays as a forward.

Career
Björk came to Djurgårdens IF from his childhood club Tungelsta IF in 2004, and progressed through the youth teams. During the 2010 pre-season, he was promoted from Djurgården's youth team. He made his Allsvenskan debut on 11 April 2011 against Kalmar FF as a substitute, scoring in a 3–2 loss.

In early July 2011, he was sent on loan to Superettan club Jönköpings Södra IF for one month. At the same time, his U21 contract was extended for one year with Djurgårdens IF. The loan deal was then extended for the rest of the season, with an opportunity for Djurgården to recall him if deemed necessary. During the 2012 season, he was sent on loan to IK Brage, with an option to end the loan prematurely in August.

In the 2013 and 2014 seasons, Björk played for Norwegian Third Division club Brattvåg IL, where he scored 70 goals in 54 matches. In 2015, he signed with Eliteserien club Aalesunds FK.

In July 2017, Björk signed for Vasalunds IF. Before the 2018 season, he moved to Division 4 club Värtans IK. Björk scored 16 goals in 19 matches for the club during the 2018 season as they won promotion to Division 3. In the 2019 season, he scored five goals in 14 league matches. The following season, Björk scored one goal in seven league matches. In the 2021 season, he played seven games and scored two goals in Division 4.

Career statistics

References

External links 
 
 
 
 

1992 births
Living people
Swedish footballers
Sweden youth international footballers
Swedish expatriate footballers
Djurgårdens IF Fotboll players
Jönköpings Södra IF players
IK Brage players
Västerås SK Fotboll players
Brattvåg IL players
Aalesunds FK players
Nyköpings BIS players
Vasalunds IF players
Allsvenskan players
Superettan players
Ettan Fotboll players
Eliteserien players
Expatriate footballers in Norway
Swedish expatriate sportspeople in Norway
Association football forwards
Footballers from Stockholm